The genus Passerina is a group of birds in the cardinal family (Cardinalidae). Although not directly related to buntings in the family Emberizidae, they are sometimes known as the North American buntings (the North American Emberizidae are colloquially called "sparrows" although they are also not closely related to these birds).

The males show vivid colors in the breeding season; the plumage of females and immature birds is duller. These birds go through two molts in a year; the males are generally less colorful in winter. They have short tails and short slim legs. They have smaller bills than other Cardinalidae; they mainly eat seeds in winter and insects in summer.

The blue grosbeak (P. caerulea) was once placed in the monotypic genus, Guiraca.

Taxonomy and list of species
The genus Passerina was introduced by the French ornithologist Louis Jean Pierre Vieillot in 1816. The type species was designated in 1840 as the indigo bunting (Passerina cyanea) by the English zoologist George Robert Gray. The genus name is from the Latin passerinus meaning "sparrow-like".

The genus contains 7 species:

References

 
Bird genera

Taxa named by Louis Jean Pierre Vieillot